Felipe de Almeida Souza (born 4 June 1991 in Santo André, São Paulo), sometimes known as just Felipe is a Brazilian footballer. Felipe Souza plays mainly as an attacking midfielder but can also play as a central midfielder who last played for Najran . Currently he play for Friends Club, A-Division league Nepal.

Club career

Melaka United
On 12 June 2017, Felipe Souza signed with Malaysian club Melaka United to compete in Malaysia Super League following the released of club previous foreign players Ezequiel Agüero and Godwin Antwi. Felipe made his league debut on 1 July 2017 playing against PKNS and scored his first goal during that match.

References

External links

1991 births
Living people
Brazilian footballers
Association football forwards
Brazilian expatriate footballers
Melaka United F.C. players
Oeste Futebol Clube players
Esporte Clube Internacional de Lages players
Najran SC players
Campeonato Brasileiro Série B players
Malaysia Premier League players
Saudi First Division League players
Expatriate footballers in Malaysia
Expatriate footballers in Saudi Arabia
Brazilian expatriate sportspeople in Malaysia
Brazilian expatriate sportspeople in Saudi Arabia
People from Santo André, São Paulo
Footballers from São Paulo (state)